Macau independence (Portuguese: Independência de Macau) is the political movement that advocates for the independence of Macau from China. Despite receiving little attention within Macau, the issue was raised in the Legislative Assembly of Macau following the Hong Kong Legislative Council oath-taking controversy. In 2017, several Chinese media outlets warned against discussion of Macau independence, fearing that speculation would lead to further action.

Background 

The Portuguese colony of Macau was established in 1557, initially in exchange for 500 taels (approx. 20 kg) of silver per year. In 1845, Queen Maria declared that Macau was to become a free port, in response to the establishment of the nearby free port of Hong Kong, which posed an economic threat to Macau. At this time, the government of Macau also became more hostile to the Qing offices established in the area and began a campaign of removing them and expanding the territory of the colony. By 1889, the territory of Macau had been expanded to roughly its current size. In 1887, the Chinese government was forced to sign the Sino-Portuguese Treaty of Peking which, among other concessions, recognised a permanent settlement of Macau by the Portuguese in exchange for Portugal agreeing to not cede the territory to another power without China's consent.

On 3 December 1966, the 12-3 incident broke out which consisted largely of anti-colonial protests by the residents of Macau. The incident erupted after corrupt colonial officials blocked the already approved construction of a private school for Chinese students on Taipa island as they had not received a bribe. Police suppression of the ensuing protests led many in Macau to turn against the colonial government, supported by the communist government in China. The subsequent turmoil, involving blockades by the Chinese military, forced the Portuguese to make a number of concessions to the protesters, including expanding the role of China in the governing of Macau, the payment of reparations to the Chinese community, as well as ceding effective control of the colony to the Communist Party of China through local proxies.

In 1975, the Portuguese offered to return Macau to China. However, as the Cultural Revolution was still wreaking havoc on the mainland, the CCP refused to take back the colony.

On 13 April 1987, the governments of Portugal and China signed the Joint Declaration on the Question of Macau to lay out the terms of the handover of Macau to the PRC. The date for the handover was set at 20 December 1999.

Ideology 
Much discussion has been had, particularly by former University of Macao scholar Chou Kwok Ping, comparing the histories of Macau and Hong Kong. Chou notes that while the events of the 1960s in Hong Kong (particularly the Hong Kong 1967 leftist riots) led those in Hong Kong to distrust the communist government in China, the fact that China supported the movements against the Portuguese government in Macau and was successful has led Macanese to look more favorably on China, and their relationship with it. This has also meant that there is a far less strong sense of local identity in Macau compared with Hong Kong. The effective loss of control by the colonial government in Macau also led to political stagnation in the colony following the 12-3 incident, while the effectiveness of the Hong Kong government in quelling the riots allowed it to continue to develop.

Macau also has a less developed sense of civil society compared to Hong Kong. Unlike its neighbour, Macau generally lacks effective civil organisations, rights groups, or a truly free press. Likewise, Macanese universities often follow political trends and there is far less protection of academic freedom. Citizens of Macau, when polled by the University of Hong Kong's Public Opinion Programme, identified significantly more strongly as "Chinese" than did their counterparts in Hong Kong.

Current situation 
The Swedish magazine The Perspective speculated that the relative lack of independence sentiment in Macau stems from the SAR's reliance on gaming and tourism revenue from China. Macau is currently one of the richest regions in the world, and its wealth is derived almost entirely from gambling, which is illegal in the PRC.

Events

2016 legislative controversy 
In 2016, following an interpretation of the Hong Kong Basic Law by the Standing Committee of the People's Republic of China, the Macau SAR government issued a requirement of all legislators to swear allegiance to the Macao Basic Law. The law also allows for the barring of potential candidates on the basis of their stated positions on issues which the government deems not in keeping with this principle.

See also 
 Hong Kong independence
 Taiwan independence movement
 Tibetan independence movement
 East Turkestan independence movement

References 

 
Independence movements
Separatism in China
History of Macau
China–Portugal relations